Balmer Lawrie & Co. Ltd. (BL) is an Indian  central public sector undertaking under the ownership of  Ministry of Petroleum and Natural Gas, Government of India. It was a partnership firm founded on 1 February 1867 in Calcutta, British India by two Scotsmen: George Stephen Balmer and Alexander Lawrie. Today Balmer Lawrie is a government sector enterprise with a turnover of ₹1612 crores and a profit of ₹232 crores as of 31 March 2020. It became a private limited company in 1924 with a paid up share capital of ₹40 lakhs, a public limited company in 1936 and then a Government of India Enterprise in 1972.

It has eight Strategic Business Units – Industrial Packaging, Greases & Lubricants, Chemicals, Travel & Vacations, Logistics Infrastructure, Logistics Services, Cold Chain and Refinery & Oil Field Services, with offices spread across the country and abroad.

Balmer Lawrie has grown enormously in the last 155 years and has become the market leader in Steel Barrels, Industrial Greases & Specialty Lubricants, Corporate Travel and Logistics Services. It has very well responded to the demands of an ever changing environment and has taken full advantage of every opportunity to innovate. Balmer Lawrie also grew inorganically through various JVs over the period of time.

References

External links

Companies nationalised by the Government of India
Companies based in Kolkata
Chemical companies of India
Packaging companies of India
Government-owned companies of India
Companies established in 1867
1867 establishments in India
Companies listed on the National Stock Exchange of India
Companies listed on the Bombay Stock Exchange
Indian companies established in 1924